Okjökull (Ok glacier) was a glacier in western Iceland on top of the shield volcano Ok.

Ok is located northeast of Reykjavík. The glacier was declared dead in 2014 by glaciologist Oddur Sigurðsson. In 2018, anthropologists Cymene Howe and Dominic Boyer of Rice University filmed a documentary about its loss, Not Ok, and proposed a commemorative plaque. The plaque was installed on August 18, 2019, with an inscription written by Andri Snær Magnason, titled "A letter to the future", in Icelandic and English. The English version reads:

Ok is the first Icelandic glacier to lose its status as a glacier.
In the next 200 years all our glaciers are expected to follow the same path.
This monument is to acknowledge that we know
what is happening and what needs to be done.
Only you know if we did it.

At the end is the global atmospheric carbon dioxide reading for that month: 415 ppm. The ceremony was attended by Katrín Jakobsdóttir, the Prime Minister of Iceland; Guðmundur Ingi Guðbrandsson, the Environment Minister; and Mary Robinson, the former President of Ireland.  The placement of the plaque is intended to raise awareness of the decline of Iceland's glaciers due to global warming. Prior to the ceremony, NASA Earth Observatory tweeted images of Okjökull in 1986 and 2019.

The Okjökull memorial plaque can be found at the coordinates, N 64°35.498' W 020°52.253' at an elevation of 1,114 meters.

References 

Glaciers of Iceland